The Buffalo Main Post Office in Buffalo, Wyoming was built in 1911 as part of a facilities improvement program by the United States Post Office Department.  The post office in Buffalo was nominated to the National Register of Historic Places as part of a thematic study comprising twelve Wyoming post offices built to standardized USPO plans in the early twentieth century.

References

External links
 at the National Park Service's NRHP database
Buffalo Main Post Office at the Wyoming State Historic Preservation Office

Neoclassical architecture in Wyoming
Government buildings completed in 1911
Buildings and structures in Buffalo, Wyoming
Post office buildings in Wyoming
Post office buildings on the National Register of Historic Places in Wyoming
1911 establishments in Wyoming
National Register of Historic Places in Johnson County, Wyoming